Harold Vernon Goldstein (December 10, 1923 – September 11, 2010), better known as Harold Gould, was an American character actor. He appeared as Martin Morgenstern on the sitcom Rhoda (1974–78) and Miles Webber on the sitcom The Golden Girls (1989–92). A five-time Emmy Award nominee, Gould acted in film and television for nearly 50 years, appearing in more than 300 television shows, 20 major motion pictures, and over 100 stage plays. He was known for playing elegant, well-dressed men (as in The Sting), and he regularly played Jewish characters and grandfather-type figures on television and in film.

Early life
Gould was born to a Jewish family in Schenectady, New York. He was the son of Louis Goldstein, a postal worker, and Lillian, a homemaker who did part-time work for the state health department. Gould was raised in Colonie, New York, and was valedictorian of his high school class. He enrolled at Albany Teachers College upon graduation (now known as University at Albany, SUNY) and studied to become a social studies or English teacher.

After two years in college, Gould enlisted in the United States Army during World War II and saw combat in France in a mortar battalion. He developed trench foot and was sent to England to recover. After convalescence, Gould served in a rail transport unit in France.

After the war Gould returned to Albany Teachers College to study drama and graduated with a bachelor's degree in 1947. He performed in summer stock theatre on Cape Cod and then decided to enroll at Cornell University to study drama and speech. Gould earned an M.A. degree in 1948 and a Ph.D. in theatre in 1953 from Cornell and also met his future wife, Lea Vernon.

Career
Upon graduation, Gould accepted a position at Randolph-Macon Woman's College in Lynchburg, Virginia, where he spent three years teaching and doing stage work. He made his professional theatre debut in 1955 as Thomas Jefferson in The Common Glory in Williamsburg.

In 1956, Gould was offered a professorship in the drama department at the University of California, Riverside, which he accepted. He taught there until 1960 when he decided to try professional acting himself. He had difficulty finding acting jobs at first and had to take work as a security guard and as a part-time acting teacher at UCLA.

Gould made his film debut in an uncredited role in Two for the Seesaw (1962). His first credited role was a small part in The Coach (also 1962). That same year he appeared as Prosecutor Tom Finney on the TV western The Virginian in the episode titled "The Accomplice." After  uncredited appearances  in Alfred Hitchcock's Marnie (1964) and The Satan Bug (1965), Gould gradually found more work with credited roles in The Yellow Canary (1964), a Rod Serling film starring Pat Boone, Jack Klugman, and Barbara Eden,   Inside Daisy Clover (1965), and Harper (1966) starring Paul Newman.

Gould appeared regularly in television in the 1960s and 1970s, including roles in Dennis the Menace, Dr. Kildare, Hazel, The Twilight Zone, The Donna Reed Show, Get Smart, Hogan's Heroes, Gunsmoke, I Dream Of Jeannie, The F.B.I., The Big Valley,  Mission: Impossible, The Man from U.N.C.L.E., Cannon, and Hawaii Five-O where he made multiple appearances as Honore Vashon, one of that series' most memorable villains. Gould originated the role of Marlo Thomas's father in the 1965 pilot for That Girl, but the series role was recast with Lew Parker. Gould appeared in The Long, Hot Summer  and He & She, two short-lived television series. He also appeared in a pilot later broadcast as a 1972 episode of Love, American Style titled "Love and the Happy Days" as Howard Cunningham, the frustrated father of a young man named Richie Cunningham (played by Ron Howard).

When ABC turned that episode into a series called Happy Days, Gould agreed to reprise the role of Howard Cunningham; however, when production of Happy Days  
was delayed, he went abroad to perform in a play. Midway through the play's run, after learning the series was ready to begin shooting, he decided to honor his commitment to the stage production and passed on Happy Days, which led to  the role of Howard Cunningham being recast with Tom Bosley. Gould would later state that a requirement to shave the beard he wore at the time was another factor in his decision to decline the role.

Gould had worked steadily in television and film for nearly fifteen years before his career began to gain momentum with his portrayal of Kid Twist in The Sting (1973), winner of seven Academy Awards, including Best Picture.  He appeared in the Woody Allen film Love and Death (1975). He was "Engulf", the villainous head of a conglomerate, in Silent Movie (1976), directed by Mel Brooks, and made guest appearances on television shows such as Petrocelli, The Love Boat and Soap  where he played the hospital roommate of Jody Dallas (Billy Crystal).

In 1972, Gould was cast as Martin Morgenstern, the father of Mary's best friend Rhoda, in an episode of The Mary Tyler Moore Show. He reprised the role the following year and was hired as a regular when Rhoda became a spin-off in 1974. Gould appeared in the short-lived 1977 series The Feather and Father Gang, starring as Harry Danton, a smooth-talking ex-con man, with Stefanie Powers as Toni "Feather" Danton, his daughter and a hard-working, successful lawyer. The show was canceled after 13 episodes, and Gould   returned to Rhoda for the remainder of its run.

Gould also appeared in the miniseries Washington: Behind Closed Doors. In the 1980 NBC miniseries The Scarlett O'Hara War, he portrayed MGM mogul Louis B. Mayer which gained him an Emmy nomination. He appeared as Chad Lowe's grandfather in Spencer and played a Jewish widower wooing the Christian Katharine Hepburn in Mrs. Delafield Wants to Marry. Other roles included a married man having an affair with another member of his Yiddish-speaking club in an episode of the PBS series The Sunset Years and as the owner of a deli grooming two African-American men to inherit his business in Singer & Sons. Gould received Emmy nominations for his roles in Rhoda, Mrs. Delafield Wants to Marry, and Moviola.

Gould played Miles Webber, the steadfast suitor of Rose Nylund (Betty White), on the NBC series The Golden Girls in 12 episodes across three seasons (he also played another of Rose's boyfriends, Arnie, in one episode of the show's first season). He reprised the role of Miles in two episodes of the spin-off, The Golden Palace, where he became the character's ex-boyfriend and married someone else.

He portrayed the father of a villain called The Prankster on Lois & Clark: The New Adventures of Superman and made guest appearances on television series such as Felicity, The King of Queens, Touched by an Angel, and Judging Amy. Gould's film roles in the 1990s and 2000s include appearances in Stuart Little, Patch Adams, The Master of Disguise,  the 2003 remake of Freaky Friday, Nobody's Perfect, and Whisper of the Heart.

His stage credits include Broadway theatre plays such as Jules Feiffer's Grown Ups, Neil Simon's Fools, Richard Baer's Mixed Emotions, and Tom Stoppard's Artist Descending a Staircase. Gould won an Obie Award in 1969 for his work in The Increased Difficulty of Concentration, written by Václav Havel, and reprised the role for a 1988 PBS version of the play.  Gould was an early and longtime (48 years) member of Theatre West, the oldest membership theatre company in Los Angeles. He played Mr. Green in Jeff Baron's Visiting Mr. Green at the Pasadena Playhouse.

Death
Gould died from prostate cancer on September 11, 2010. He had two sons, Joshua and Lowell, and a daughter, Deborah. He and Lea were married for 60 years.

Filmography

Films

Television

Theatre
 The House of Blue Leaves (1970) - Artie Shaughnessy - Truck and Warehouse Theatre, New York City, NY
 The Skin of Our Teeth (1983) - Mr. Antrobus - Old Globe Theatre, San Diego, CA
 The Substance of Fire (1996) - Isaac Geldhart - Old Globe Theater, San Diego, CA
 Visiting Mr. Green (1999) - Mr. Green - Pasadena Playhouse
 Old Wicked Songs (2002) - Professor Josef Mashkan - Rubicon Theatre Company
 Tuesdays With Morrie (2005) - Morrie Schwartz - Rubicon Theatre Company

References

External links

 
 
 
 

1923 births
2010 deaths
Actors from Schenectady, New York
American male film actors
Jewish American male actors
American male television actors
United States Army personnel of World War II
Cornell University alumni
Obie Award recipients
University at Albany, SUNY alumni
Deaths from prostate cancer
Deaths from cancer in California
20th-century American male actors
21st-century American male actors
21st-century American Jews